Sigrid Smuda-Fröschl (born 4 February 1960) is a German speed skater. She competed at the 1980 Winter Olympics and the 1984 Winter Olympics.

References

1960 births
Living people
German female speed skaters
Olympic speed skaters of West Germany
Speed skaters at the 1980 Winter Olympics
Speed skaters at the 1984 Winter Olympics
Sportspeople from Munich